The Association of Surgeons of Great Britain and Ireland is a British medical association founded in 1920 with the twin aims of the advancement of the science and art of surgery and the promotion of friendship amongst surgeons.  Berkeley Moynihan was a driving force behind the association's creation.

Presidents
Past presidents of the association include:
Baron Ribeiro
Sir Hedley Atkins
Sir Geoffrey Jefferson
Sir James Learmonth
Sir Hugh Cairns
Sir Max Page
Sir Claude Frankau
Sir David Wilkie
Baron Moynihan
Sir John Bland-Sutton
Robin C. N. Williamson
Sir Herbert Duthie

References

External links
 http://www.asgbi.org.uk/

Surgical organisations based in the United Kingdom
1920 establishments in the United Kingdom
Organizations established in 1920